Kerosene 454 was a punk rock band from Washington, D.C. They formed in 1992.  The core of the group, brothers John and Jim Wall along with Erik Denno, went through a number of drummers before hooking up with Darren Zentek in time to record their 1st LP, Situation At Hand.  This lineup continued to tour and record for 5 years, releasing the LPs Came By To Kill Me in 1996 and At Zero in 1998, both of which appeared on the Slowdime Records label (in conjunction with Dischord Records), which John Wall co-ran.  The group split up soon after the release of At Zero. Darren Zentek is currently drumming in Office of Future Plans.

Members
Erik Denno (guitar/vocals)
Jim Wall (guitar/vocals)
John Wall (bass)
Darren Zentek (drums)

Discography

Albums
Situation at Hand (Art Monk Construction LP/CD, 1995)
Came By To Kill Me (Slowdime/Dischord LP/CD, 1996)
Race (Polyvinyl CD, 1997) - compilation of early releases
At Zero (Slowdime/Dischord LP/CD, 1998)
Touring Japan (Time Bomb LP/CD, 1998) - split with Naht, Sweetbelly Freakdown and Bluetip

Singles
"Two For Flinching" (Art Monk Construction 7", 1993)
"Down in Three" (Strict Records 7", 1993)
"Blown Clean" (Firepower Products 7", 1994)
"Some Walk" b/w "Kisses" (Strict Records 7", 1995) - split with Angel Hair
"T-Minus 100" (Maggadee Records 7", 1996) - split with Bluetip

Dischord Records artists
Punk rock groups from Washington, D.C.
Polyvinyl Record Co. artists